Aptostichus atomarius, the San Bernardino hills trapdoor spider, is a species of wafer-lid trapdoor spider in the family Euctenizidae. It is found in the United States.

References

Further reading

External links

 

Euctenizidae
Articles created by Qbugbot
Spiders described in 1891